Catete Station is a subway station on the Rio de Janeiro Metro that services the neighbourhood of Catete in the South Zone of Rio de Janeiro.

References

Metrô Rio stations